Lyubov Volkova (15 October 1932 – 16 August 2015) was a Soviet alpine skier. She competed in three events at the 1960 Winter Olympics.

References

1932 births
2015 deaths
Soviet female alpine skiers
Olympic alpine skiers of the Soviet Union
Alpine skiers at the 1960 Winter Olympics
Place of birth missing